Naomine Iwaya (born 10 December 1960) is a Japanese former alpine skier who competed in the 1984 Winter Olympics.

External links
 

1960 births
Living people
Japanese male alpine skiers
Olympic alpine skiers of Japan
Alpine skiers at the 1984 Winter Olympics
Asian Games medalists in alpine skiing
Asian Games gold medalists for Japan
Alpine skiers at the 1986 Asian Winter Games
Medalists at the 1986 Asian Winter Games
20th-century Japanese people